Darwin Forest Country Park now known as Landal Darwin Forest is a  holiday resort near Matlock in Derbyshire, England, operated by Pinelodge Holidays Limited. The resort contains a large number of luxury lodges produced by Pinelog (an independent holiday home manufacturer), a swimming pool and gym, a bar and restaurant, an onsite convenience store (Woodland Store) and the Little Monkey's children's play centre. Nearby in Ashbourne is the smaller sister resort Landal Sandybrook.

The country park has received the David Bellamy Gold Award and the Hoseasons 'Best lodge park in Britain' accolade. The park is owned by the Grayson family and joined the Landal franchise in 2018.

References

Holiday camps